Gorostiaga is a surname of Basque origin. It may refer to:

People
Alejandro Gorostiaga (1840–1912), Chilean military officer
Koldo Gorostiaga Atxalandabaso, (1940), Basque university lecturer and politician
José Benjamín Gorostiaga, (1822-1891), Argentine lawyer and politician; see Argentine Constitution of 1853
José Eustaquio Gorostiaga, (1838-?), Chilean military in the 1881 Battle of Miraflores, Lima, Peru
Dolores Gorostiaga, (1957), vice-president of Cantabria from 2003 to 2011

Places
 Gorostiaga (Buenos Aires), a settlement in Chivilcoy Partido, Argentina

Basque-language surnames